Bigbug is a French science fiction black comedy film, written and directed by Jean-Pierre Jeunet, that was released on 11 February 2022 by Netflix. It stars Elsa Zylberstein, Isabelle Nanty, Youssef Hajdi, Alban Lenoir and François Levantal. Set in the world of 2045, where communities have robotic helpers, a group of suburbanites are locked in for their own protection by their household robots, while a rogue, sentient AI android revolt uprising outside.

Synopsis 
In 2045, artificial intelligence is everywhere. So much so that humanity relies on it to satisfy its every need and every desire, even the most secret and wicked. In a quiet suburban residential area, four domestic robots suddenly decide to take their masters hostage in their own home. Locked together, a not-quite-so-blended family, an intrusive neighbor, and her enterprising domestic robots are now forced to put up with each other in an increasingly hysterical atmosphere. While outside, the Yonyx, the latest generation of AI androids, are becoming rogue and attempting to take over the world. When the tensions begin to rise as the threat draws closer, the humans look elsewhere, get jealous, and rip into each other under the bewildered eyes of their indoor robots. Maybe it's the robots who've got a soul or not.

Cast 
 Isabelle Nanty as Françoise
 Elsa Zylberstein as Alice
 Claude Perron as Monique
 Stéphane De Groodt as Max
 Youssef Hajdi as Victor
 Claire Chust as Jennifer 
 François Levantal as Yonyx leader
 Alban Lenoir as Greg
 Marysole Fertard as Nina
 Hélie Thonnat as Léo
 Dominique Pinon as Igor

Production
Filming began in October 2020 despite the COVID-19 pandemic. The film was shot on an Arri Alexa LF.

Reception

On the review aggregator website Rotten Tomatoes, 46% of 35 reviews are positive, with an average rating of 5.60/10. The website's critics consensus states, "Jeunet fans will find the whimsy they seek within BigBug, although it isn't enough to make this mishmash more than intermittently engaging." On Metacritic, the film has a weighted average score of 46 out of 100 based on 14 critics' reviews, indicating "mixed or average reviews".

Themes and analysis
When asked about the film's subtext on the future of humanity, Jeunet stated:

"I hate messages. But if there is a message in “Bigbug” it is that artificial intelligence will never kill human beings because they will stay stupid. They don’t have a soul."

The film was interpreted by several critics as a political satire, mocking COVID-19 lockdowns and humanity's increasing dependence on technology. Armond White of National Review wrote that the film is "about mankind trapped in its own hubris", which was "the first great satire of the Covid-era lockdown and Big Tech enslavement." The film contains a reference to a pandemic known as "COVID-50".

References

External links 
 
 

2022 films
2022 black comedy films
2022 science fiction films
2020s French films
2020s French-language films
2020s satirical films
Android (robot) films
Films about artificial intelligence
Films directed by Jean-Pierre Jeunet
Films set in 2050
French-language Netflix original films
French science fiction comedy films
French satirical films
Gaumont Film Company films
Government by algorithm in fiction
Robot films
Utopian films